Neptis jordani, or Jordan's sailer, is a butterfly of the family Nymphalidae. It is found in Sub-Saharan Africa. The habitat consists of areas near rivers and grassy marshes.

The wingspan is 38–42 mm in males and 44–45 mm in females. Adults are probably on the wing year round.

The larvae feed on Polygonum strigonum.

References

Butterflies described in 1910
jordani